Scott Thomas is a former American football player.  He was elected to the College Football Hall of Fame in 2012.

Collegiately, Thomas played for Air Force and was the captain of their one loss 1985 team.  He was named to the 1985 College Football All-America Team and was MVP of the 1985 Bluebonnet Bowl.  After he graduated, he flew combat missions in Desert Storm flying F-16s.  He was shot down and picked up by Search and Rescue forces as he was being stalked by Iraqi forces intent on capturing him.  He was awarded the Distinguished Flying Cross.

References

1964 births
Living people
All-American college football players
Players of American football from San Antonio
Air Force Falcons football players
College Football Hall of Fame inductees
Recipients of the Distinguished Flying Cross (United States)